Gabriel Bitan (born 23 July, 1998) is a track and field athlete from Romania. He was a bronze medalist at the 2023 European Athletics Indoor Championships in the long jump.

Career
From Bucharest, Bitan won has won multiple Romanian national long jump titles, indoors and outdoors, since his first wins in both in 2019. He also won the 2021 and 2022 Balkan Athletics Championships.

Competing at the 2021 European Athletics Indoor Championships in Poland Bitan finished in eighth place in Torun.

Bitan won bronze at the 2023 European Athletics Indoor Championships in Istanbul, with a jump of eight metres. After the event he implied credit to his coach Anișoara Cușmir for giving him the advice to improve his jumps
and win the medal.

References

External links

Living people
1998 births
Romanian male long jumpers
Sportspeople from Bucharest 
Romanian athletics biography stubs